A chime bar or resonator bell is a percussion instrument consisting of a tuned metal bar similar to a glockenspiel bar, with each bar mounted on its own wooden resonator. Chime bars are played with mallets again similar to a glockenspiel.

The sound is similar to a glockenspiel, but with much more sustain, similar in this respect to a vibraphone but without the vibrato.

Chime bars can be arranged on a table to be played by a single player, or played by a group in a similar fashion to handbells, with each member holding a chime in one hand and a mallet in the other. They are used from professional music to classrooms.

See also
 Tubular bell, also known as bar chime
 Mark tree, also known as bar chimes
 Percussion instrument

References

Idiophones
Pitched percussion instruments